No. 292 Squadron RAF was an air-sea rescue (ASR) squadron of the Royal Air Force operating in the Bay of Bengal during the Second World War.

History
292 squadron was formed at RAF Jessore, Bengal, (then) British India, on 1 February 1944, as a dedicated air-sea rescue squadron equipped with Walrus flying boats.  A detachment of the squadron was sent further south, in Ceylon. In April the squadron received a number of Vickers Warwick patrol aircraft, but these were found to be unsuitable in the tropical climate, and in December 1944 they received Consolidated Liberator Mk.VIs as replacements.  In November 1944 the squadron already received a number of Supermarine Sea Otters, a bit more modern flying boat.  The squadron were posted to RAF Agartala in February 1945, as operations had shifted further eastwards through Burma; they were located there when the squadron was disbanded on 14 June. Its duties were then taken over by three independent flights, No's 1347, 1348 and 1349 Flight RAF.

Aircraft operated

Squadron Airfield

References

Notes

Bibliography

External links
 292 Squadron Association
 No. 292 Squadron RAF movement and equipment history
 History of No. 292 Squadron
 292 Squadron reports

292 Squadron
Military units and formations established in 1944
Military units and formations disestablished in 1945
Military units and formations of Ceylon in World War II